Waltraut Haas (born 9 June 1927) is an Austrian actress and singer.

Born in Vienna, Haas grew up at Schloss Schönbrunn, where her mother was a restaurateur. Haas made her stage debut in Linz but was soon won over to the big screen. She achieved fame and recognition already through her first movie, the cult classic Der Hofrat Geiger (1947), in which she played Mariandl, the illegitimate daughter of a woman who runs an inn in the picturesque Wachau valley. In 1961, Haas would play Mariandl's single mother in a remake entitled Mariandl. Her other famous movie role was that of Josepha Vogelhuber in the 1960 film The White Horse Inn (Im weißen Rößl) opposite Peter Alexander. After 60 movies, mainly comedies and musicals, she stopped making films around 1970. Since then, she has also appeared on television.

From 1966 until his death in 2011, Waltraut Haas was married to actor Erwin Strahl, with whom she frequently performed both on the stage and in films. Their son Marcus Strahl is an actor and director.

Haas lives in Hietzing, Vienna.

Select filmography

Decorations and awards
 1957:"Pearl of the Atlantic" at Mar del Plata Film Festival
 1987: Medal of the capital Vienna in gold
 1988: Robert Stolz Award for her portrayal of Der kleine Gardeoffizier (Little Guardsman)
 2001: Grand Decoration of Honour for Services to the province of Lower Austria
 2001: Rose of Lake Wörthersee: best actress
 2002: Austrian Cross of Honour for Science and Art
 2003: Golden Harp Music Association Friends of the operetta
 2010: Golden Medal of Honour for Services to the city of Vienna

References

External links
 
 Photos of her 39th wedding anniversary, taken at Marchfelderhof, Deutsch-Wagram, August 2005
Photographs of Waltraut Haas
 The official Websites of Waltraut Haas & Erwin Strahl

1927 births
Living people
People from Hietzing
Austrian stage actresses
Recipients of the Austrian Cross of Honour for Science and Art
Austrian film actresses
Austrian television actresses
20th-century Austrian actresses